Dave Alan Capuano (born July 27, 1968) is an American former professional ice hockey left winger. Capuano was born in Warwick, Rhode Island, but grew up in Cranston, Rhode Island.

Now he lives with his Wife Lori, and his 2 kids Jaclyn and Max.

Playing career
Capuano played for the University of Maine for three seasons from 1986–1989. He was drafted by the Pittsburgh Penguins in the second round of the 1986 NHL Entry Draft, 25th overall. His first NHL game was during the 1989–90 season, when he played 6 games for the Penguins. He was traded to the Vancouver Canucks on January 8, 1990 in a trade that sent Capuano, Andrew McBain and Dan Quinn to the Canucks for Rod Buskas, Barry Pederson and Tony Tanti. He played 88 games with the Canucks before being traded again, this time to the Tampa Bay Lightning for Anatoli Semenov. He only played 6 games with the Lightning during the 1992–93 season before being traded to the San Jose Sharks in June 1993. He would play only 4 games with the Sharks before retiring from professional hockey.

Personal life
He currently resides in Cranston, Rhode Island with his wife. Capuano is still involved in hockey, coaching for the new junior team of the Metropolitan Junior Hockey League, the Cranston Reds. His brother Jack Capuano was the head coach of the New York Islanders, and his son, Max MacKay, is a former player in the ECHL last playing a stint in the 2014–15 season with the Wheeling Nailers.

Awards and honors

Hobey Baker Award Finalist (1988, 1989)

Transactions
June 21, 1986 – Drafted in the second round, 25th overall by the Pittsburgh Penguins in the 1986 NHL Entry Draft
January 8, 1990 – Traded by the Pittsburgh Penguins with Andrew McBain and Dan Quinn to the Vancouver Canucks for Rod Buskas, Barry Pederson, and Tony Tanti
November 3, 1992 – Traded by the Vancouver Canucks with the Canucks' fourth round selection (Ryan Duthie) in the 1994 NHL Entry Draft to the Tampa Bay Lightning for Anatoli Semenov
June 19, 1993 – Traded by the Tampa Bay Lightning to the San Jose Sharks for Peter Ahola
November 5, 1993 – Traded by the San Jose Sharks to the Boston Bruins for cash

Career statistics

Regular season and playoffs

International

References

External links

1968 births
Living people
American men's ice hockey left wingers
Atlanta Knights players
Hamilton Canucks players
Ice hockey players from Rhode Island
Maine Black Bears men's ice hockey players
Milwaukee Admirals (IHL) players
Muskegon Lumberjacks players
Pittsburgh Penguins draft picks
Pittsburgh Penguins players
Providence Bruins players
San Jose Sharks players
Sportspeople from Cranston, Rhode Island
Sportspeople from Warwick, Rhode Island
Tampa Bay Lightning players
Vancouver Canucks players
Mount Saint Charles Academy alumni
AHCA Division I men's ice hockey All-Americans